Sherm is a shortened version of the given name Sherman and may refer to:

People 
Sherm Chavoor (1919-1992), American swimming coach
Sherm Cohen (born 1965), American storyboard artist
Sherm Feller (1918–1994), American musician and sports announcer
Sherm Lollar (1924–1977), American Major League Baseball player (catcher)

Media 
Sherm, an enemy seen in the video game, Super Mario Odyssey

Other uses 
Slang for Nat Sherman, an American tobacco brand, named for its founder
"sherm stick", a cigarette soaked in PCP (see Phencyclidine#Recreational uses)

See also 
 Society for Human Resource Management (SHRM, pronounced as "sherm")